Sheffield Castle was a castle in Sheffield, England, constructed at the confluence of the River Sheaf and the River Don, possibly on the site of a former Anglo-Saxon long house, and dominating the early town. A motte and bailey castle had been constructed on the site at some time in the century following the Norman Conquest of England in 1066. This was destroyed in the Second Barons' War. Construction of a second castle, this time in stone, began four years later in 1270.

Mary, Queen of Scots was held prisoner in this castle and its associated estates at various times during the 14 years between 1570 and 1584, alternating with other properties of George Talbot, 6th Earl of Shrewsbury. The castle was held by Royalist forces for part of the English Civil War, and was surrendered to the Parliamentarians in 1644 following a short siege. Its demolition was ordered soon after, and the castle was razed. There are no known surviving drawings or plans of the castle, but excavations in the 1920s revealed stone foundations from the castle begun in 1270 as well as evidence of earlier structures.
Further architectural investigation was possible in 2015, following the demolition of the 20th-century market which had been built on top of the ruins.

Background
Sheffield Castle was located at the confluence of the River Sheaf and the River Don, on the western bank of the Sheaf and the southern bank of the Don. The rivers provided defence to the north and east and there was a moat on the south and western sides of the castle. This site was largely covered by Castle Market which was demolished in 2015.

Early activity on the site is suggested by several finds including a Bronze Age flint horseshoe scraper, and in the Roman period Samian Ware and Silchester pottery, discovered during excavations in the 1920s.

The site of the castle is the place where the earliest settlement at Sheffield was founded sometime in the second half of the 1st millennium AD. The Domesday Book of 1086 states that, prior to the Norman Conquest of England in 1066, Waltheof II, Earl of Northumbria, had an aula (hall) in the manor of Hallam. In the same entry, it is reported that the manor of Sheffield—which had been part of Hallam—was under the Lordship of Sweyn at the time of the conquest. It has been speculated that Waltheof's aula or Sweyn's stronghold may have been at this site, and excavations between 1927 and 1930 were claimed to have uncovered evidence of a Saxon structure. However, on the basis of three separate extracts from the Domesday Survey it can be shown that the manors of Hallam, Attercliffe, and Sheffield were three distinct and separate entities at the time of the Survey and beyond; and that the village of Hallam and Waltheof's aula could only have been located in the manor of Hallam, and not Sheffield.

The studies conducted by A. L. Armstrong during the archaeological investigations of the late 1920s provide evidence that the Saxon remains were not those of Waltheof's aula. Armstrong's description suggests that the timbers were cut down to the level of the surrounding earth, burned, and the area immediately cleared to make way for the construction of the Lovetot castle (circa 1100), some two decades after the destruction of Waltheof's aula.

William de Lovetot's castle
The construction of the first castle at Sheffield following the Norman invasion of England is usually attributed to William de Lovetot, an Anglo-Norman Baron from Huntingdonshire. De Lovetot acquired the lordship of the manor of Hallamshire (including Sheffield) in the early twelfth century during the reign of Henry I. The earliest known reference to a castle at Sheffield is a return made by Ralph Murdac, sheriff of Derbyshire, concerning the wardship of Maud de Lovetot (the great granddaughter of William), dating from around 1188.

It is thought that this castle was a wooden motte and bailey type. Maud de Lovetot married Gerard de Furnival in 1204 and the castle and town of Sheffield passed to the Furnival family. Gerard de Furnival's grandson, Thomas, supported the Royalist cause during the Second Barons' War of 1264–1267. In 1266 a party of anti-monarchy barons, led by John de Eyvill, marching from north Lincolnshire to Derbyshire passed through Sheffield and destroyed the town, burning the church and castle.

Thomas de Furnival's castle
In 1270 Thomas de Furnival obtained a charter from King Henry III to build a castle at Sheffield. Thomas died soon after the castle was completed and was buried in the castle. The castle was damaged on 24 February 1574 when Sheffield suffered an earthquake damaging the apartment where Mary Queen of Scots was held prisoner.  In 1707 a report was published stating that, when the castle was demolished in 1648, a large flat stone was found engraved I Lord Furnival; I built this castle-hall; And under this wall; Within this tomb was my burial.

A  park was attached to the castle, it extended from the castle to Gleadless to the south and Handsworth to the east. In 1516, George Talbot, 4th Earl of Shrewsbury, built the alternative residence of Sheffield Manor in the park.

Destruction of the castle
On 11 October 1642, as England moved towards civil war, the town and castle was seized by Sir John Gell for the Parliamentarians. In April 1643, Royalist forces led by the Earl of Newcastle entered Yorkshire and took Leeds, Wakefield, and Rotherham before approaching Sheffield. The Parliamentary defenders of Sheffield castle fled into Derbyshire allowing the Royalists to take the castle without a fight. Newcastle left a garrison at the castle, under the control of Sir William Savile, as recounted by Margaret Cavendish, Newcastle's wife:

Sir William Savile left Sheffield and the castle under the control of his deputy, Major Thomas Beaumont, who held Sheffield until August 1644 when the Earl of Manchester sent Major-General Crawford and Colonel Pickering, a force of 1,200 soldiers to recapture Sheffield for the Parliamentarians. At first the castle resisted, and finding their artillery—the largest of which was a demi-culverin—was insufficient to breach the castle wall, General Crawford sent a letter to Lord Fairfax for a demi-cannon (the Queen's pocket-pistoll) and a whole culverin. These extra cannon were able to breach the castle wall, after which terms for the surrender of the castle were agreed:

During the battle to recapture the Castle, John Stilgoe, who was a Royalist (despite the rest of his family being on the opposite side) was killed. He dictated his will, leaving his goods to the family who were of the same ilk as him.

Lady Savile (mentioned in this agreement) was the widow of Sir William Savile. She was pregnant at the time of the siege, and went into labour the night after the castle was surrendered.

Following the siege Colonel John Bright of Carbrook Hall was left as governor of the castle. He was soon appointed governor of the city of York, and so left Captain Edward Gill in charge of Sheffield. On 30 April 1646 the House of Commons passed a resolution that Sheffield Castle should be made untenable, and on 13 July 1647 a resolution was passed for the castle to be demolished. Despite considerable demolition work, in 1649 the Earl of Arundel repurchased Sheffield castle with the intention of restoring it, but the damage was too great and no restoration work was ever started. The castle was soon completely razed; for a while it was used as an orchard, and then a bowling green, before being built over.

Some of the stone from the castle was used in the construction of the now demolished Free Grammar School of King James of England, within the town of Sheffield, in the County of York, which was built on Townhead Street in 1648.

Archaeological investigations and remains

1920s

An excavation led by Leslie Armstrong in 1927, before the construction of the Brightside and Carbrook Co-operative Society store, uncovered the base of one of the gateway bastion towers, as well as part of the gateway itself. These remains of the castle are preserved under the city's Castle Market: they are Grade II listed and are open for viewing.

The visible remains were situated in two rooms below the now demolished Castle Market. One room was open to the public, pending booking of a tour, the other room was walled and the only access was via a manhole in the market's food court. The remaining ruins, approximately 32 feet above the River Don, are those of one of the gate towers, they represent a quarter of the Eastern tower.

1999 to 2001
More recent excavations in 1999 and 2001 by ARCUS, Sheffield University's archaeological research and consultancy unit, revealed the castle to have been much larger than had been thought: among the largest medieval castles in England. Drilling was done in the upper food court delivery yard and flag stones left in situ to mark boundaries of the castle.

A group of volunteers have formed the Friends of Sheffield Castle to research and promote the interests of the remains.

Castlegate redevelopment
Sheffield City Council announced plans in August 2014 to rebuild the entrance to the castle as part of a £5 million regeneration of the city's Castlegate area. The plan is dependent on raising the required funds; the council has committed £1 million to the project, and further financial support has come through a series of bids.

In July 2017 a £786,000 fund was announced to redevelop the Sheffield Castlegate area as a green corridor, including funding of a major archaeological dig. The excavation project was undertaken in August 2018 by Wessex Archaeology in cooperation with students from the University of Sheffield's archaeology department. A virtual reality model of the Castle, created by the University, was on display from 20 to 27 September 2018 at the Millennium Gallery.

Notes
Citations

References

 (wikisource)

Further reading

External links 
List of archive and library material relating to Sheffield Castle held at Sheffield City Council's Libraries and Archives.
The Friends Of Sheffield Castle, a group of local heritage volunteers

Buildings and structures completed in the 13th century
Castles in South Yorkshire
History of Sheffield
Grade II listed buildings in Sheffield